Rowa Automatisierungssysteme GmbH is market leader for automated stock handling in pharmacies and hospitals with its storage and dispensing systems.

Medical supplies are scanned into the system, stored and then dispensed at the pharmacy sales counter using conveyor technology. The company has its headquarters in Kelberg, Eifel and employs over 300 staff. There are subsidiaries in Denmark, Italy, the Netherlands and Sweden. In 2011 turnover reached about 64 Million Euros and the company is one of the top 100 companies in Rheinland-Pfalz in terms of turnover. In 2011, Rowa was integrated in the global medical device company CareFusion, San Diego.

History 
Rowa Automatisierungssysteme GmbH was founded in 1996 by Rudolf Wagner and Markus Willems. In 2006, Dirk Wingenter joined the management board and in 2009, Dr Christian Klas became the fourth member of the board. In 2011, Jean-Michel Deckers became a member of the board.

The original business idea was triggered by a couple of pharmacists. They were keen to restructure workflows effectively in the modern pharmacy. In 1997 the first automated storage and dispensing system was installed in a Dresden pharmacy. Today about 10,000 pharmacies and hospitals all over the world are using Rowa Systems. PharmaXie, presented as the pharmacy of the future at the world fair Expo 2000, was equipped with Rowa storage and dispensing systems.

Product range 
Rowa produces and distributes automated stock handling systems for pharmacies. These systems are developed individually for each pharmacy or hospital. Like in a high-bay warehouse, medicaments are stored in random storage according to their size and height. These systems are developed individually for each pharmacy or hospital and store medication supplies as if in a high-bay warehouse without being ordered by size or depth. With high flexibility of the size, the systems can be adapted to the particular requirements of each pharmacy.

Additional options include fully automated storage, or a consultation and dispensing terminal for pharmacies. In the latter case, patients can get advice through a video-conferencing facility and medicine can be dispensed remotely. This system, known as Visavia, is currently being contested in Germany. As a result of a decision (Reference Number 3C 30.09 and 31.09) by the German Federal Administrative Court, it is only partially approved. In other countries this type of terminal is in extensive use.

Awards and certification 
 41 cases of Intellectual Property Right (IPR) and patents
 TÜV- and GS-certified (ID-Nummer 0000028411)through the German technical inspection authority
 red dot design award
 Nominee for the German Design Award 2011
 Rheinland-Pfalz Erfinderpreis, a state award for inventors
 Holkenbrink Award
 Best Pharmacy Partner 2011 and 2012 in the "Storage and Dispensing Systems" category (survey of University of Worms and PharmaRundschau)

Membership 
 IDA – Innovationsakademie deutscher Apotheken (Innovation academy for German pharmacies)
 Future Care – Informationsplattform für TeleHealth des Branchenverbands BITKOM (Information point for TeleHealth by ICT industry association BITKOM)
 MiA – Marketingverband innovativer Apothekendienstleister (Marketing Association for Innovative Pharmacy Service Providers)

References

External links 
 Das Unternehmergespräch: Rudolf Wagner, Gründer und Geschäftsführer der RowaAutomatisierungssysteme GmbH – „Apotheker erhalten mehr Zeit und Platz“.) (Conversation with an entrepreneur: Rudolf Wagner, founder and chief executive officer, Rowa Automatisierungssysteme GmbH). Article in: Frankfurter Allgemeine Zeitung. 15 March 2010.
 Wenn Roboter Arzneien holen. (When robots fetch our medicines). Article in: Süddeutsche Zeitung. 8 June 2010.
 Automaten-Verkauf: Die Apotheke als Selbstbedienungsladen. (Automated sales: the pharmacy as a self-service facility). Article in: Handelsblatt. 24 June 2010.
 Decision of the German Federal Administrative Court, 9 August 2010(Az. 3 C 30.09 and 31.09)
 Top 100 – Die umsatzstärksten Unternehmen in Rheinland Pfalz. (Top 100 – Rheinland Pfalz businesses with the highest turnover). (Ranking by the Rheinland-Pfalz Bank, October 2010)

Companies based in Rhineland-Palatinate
Companies established in 1996
Eifel
German brands
Manufacturing companies of Germany
Robotics companies of Germany